The Benevolent; The Drinks Industry Charity, formerly known as The Wine & Spirit Trades' Benevolent Society, is a registered charity based in the United Kingdom that provides practical, emotional and financial support to people who work or have worked in the UK drinks industry, and their families. 

The charity was founded in 1886 following the publication of a letter written by Robert Gray, a City of London wine merchant, to the Chairman of the Wine and Spirit Association proposing the formation of a Benevolent Society for the current and previous long-term employees of the wine and spirit trade facing hardship. The charity now supports people from all areas of the drinks industry including those involved in the production, distribution, marketing, import, export and sales of alcohol in both the on trade and off trade of the UK market. The charity operates in England, Wales and Northern Ireland. Members of the drinks industry in Scotland are supported by The Benevolent's sister charity The Ben.

References

External links
http://www.thebenevolent.org.uk/
http://www.thedrinksbusiness.com/2013/08/the-benevolent-announces-three-new-trustees/
http://www.harpers.co.uk/news/tour-of-the-douro-raises-30k-for-the-benevolent/348030.article

Charities based in London
Organizations established in 1886
Alcohol in England